Djouori-Agnili  is a department of Haut-Ogooué Province in south-eastern Gabon. The capital lies at Bongoville. It had a population of 4,210 in 2013.

Towns and villages

References

Departments of Gabon
Haut-Ogooué Province